is a Japanese professional golfer.

Ichihara played on the Japan Golf Tour, winning once.

Professional wins (3)

Japan Golf Tour wins (1)

Japan Challenge Tour wins (2)

Results in major championships

CUT = missed the halfway cut
Note: Ichihara only played in The Open Championship.

Team appearances
Amateur
Eisenhower Trophy (representing Japan): 1996

External links

Japanese male golfers
Japan Golf Tour golfers
Sportspeople from Kanagawa Prefecture
1978 births
Living people